RV Ocean Researcher V was a research vessel owned by the Taiwan Ocean Research Institute that sank off the coast of Penghu, Taiwan in 2014.

History

Sinking

On 9 October 2014 the ship departed from Anping Harbor in Anping District, Tainan for an eight-day cruise  researching pollutants in the atmosphere and how they propagate. Those aboard included researchers from the Academia Sinica, Taiwan Typhoon and Flood Research Institute, graduate students from National Taiwan Ocean University, National Yang Ming University, National Yunlin University of Science and Technology and National Cheng Kung University.

On the evening of 10 October 2014, due to Typhoon Vongfong, the ship ran onto a reef off the Penghu Islands. The ship listed and began to take on water, sinking at 8:11 pm. Most of the occupants boarded life-rafts to await rescue.

Rescue operations
Eight rescue helicopters, two C-130 transport planes, four navy frigates and five patrol boats were sent to the accident scene.

Casualties
One researcher was pronounced dead upon arrival at hospital and another died when attempts to resuscitate him failed.

See also
 Transportation in Taiwan

References

2014 in Taiwan
Maritime incidents in 2014
Transportation disasters in Taiwan
Ships of Taiwan
2014 disasters in Taiwan